Patience and virtue is a proverbial phrase referring to one of the seven heavenly virtues typically said to date back to "Psychomachia," an epic poem written in the fifth century. In popular culture, "Patience and  Virtue" can refer to:
 a 1991 single by Lois Reeves, part of the Motorcity Records singles discography
 a bonus track on some versions of the 2007 album Release the Stars by Rufus Wainwright 
 a 2010 mixtape from Romeo Miller's discography
 Rachel Weisz's character Evelyn "Evie" Carnahan O'Connell said the phrase in The Mummy

Proverbs